Sanchai and Sonchat Ratiwatana were the defending champions but lost in the first round to Gong Maoxin and Hsieh Cheng-peng.

Luke Saville and Jordan Thompson won the title after defeating Go Soeda and Yasutaka Uchiyama 6–3, 5–7, [10–6] in the final.

Seeds

Draw

References
 Main Draw

Shimadzu All Japan Indoor Tennis Championships - Doubles
2018 Doubles